The 1991–92 Greek Football Cup was the 50th edition of the Greek Football Cup.

Tournament details

Totally 72 teams participated, 18 from Alpha Ethniki, 18 from Beta, and 36 from Gamma. It was held in 6 rounds, included final.

Until quarter-finals, there were not surprises but also big confrontations, minus the qualification of Iraklis against Aris and the elimination of AEL from the Group stage by teams of lower divisions. Most remarkable result of Second Round was the elimination of Panionios by Atromitos. Even if Panionios won 5–0 in the Nea Smyrni Stadium, it was changed in 0–2 without match, because of outlaw use of a footballer by home team side, while they did not accomplish to reverse the score in the second leg.

In quarter-finals, Olympiacos eliminated Panathinaikos with away goals rule, with a penalty in last minutes of second match. In semi-finals, PAOK eliminated with an impressive 3–0 home victory after extra time (3–2 on aggregate) the champions of the season, AEK Athens. In the Final (two-legged matches for second and last time) Olympiacos were awarded the cup, with a 1–1 draw away and a 2–0 win in their home. They won the cup for 19th time in their history. First scorer was elected Michalis Iordanidis of Doxa Drama, with 9 goals.

Calendar

Group stage

The phase was played in a single round-robin format. Each win would gain 2 points, each draw 1 and each loss would not gain any point.

Group 1

Group 2

Group 3

Group 4

Group 5

Group 6

Group 7

Group 8

Group 9

Group 10

Group 11

Group 12

Group 13

Group 14

Group 15

Group 16

Knockout phase
Each tie in the knockout phase, was played over two legs, with each team playing one leg at home. The team that scored more goals on aggregate over the two legs advanced to the next round. If the aggregate score was level, the away goals rule was applied, i.e. the team that scored more goals away from home over the two legs advanced. If away goals were also equal, then extra time was played. The away goals rule was again applied after extra time, i.e. if there were goals scored during extra time and the aggregate score was still level, the visiting team advanced by virtue of more away goals scored. If no goals were scored during extra time, the winners were decided by a penalty shoot-out. The mechanism of the draws for each round is as follows:
There are no seedings, and teams from the same group can be drawn against each other.

Bracket

Round of 32

|}

*The match originally ended 5–0 for Panionios but later it was awarded 0–2 to Atromitos.

Round of 16

|}

Quarter-finals

|}

Semi-finals

|}

Final

The 48th Greek Cup Final was a two-legged tie. First leg was played at the Toumba Stadium, and second leg at the Karaiskakis Stadium.

First leg

Second leg

References

External links
 Greek Cup 1991-92 at RSSSF

Greek Football Cup seasons
Greek Cup
Cup